John Johnson, 8th Seigneur of Sark (died 1723) was Seigneur of Sark from 1720 to 1723. 

The colonel and former commander of the garrison in Guernsey bought the fief from Lord Carteret in 1720.

References

Seigneurs of Sark
1723 deaths
Year of birth unknown